Murilo Antonio Fischer (born 16 June 1979) is a Brazilian former professional road bicycle racer, who rode professionally between 2004 and 2016 for the , ,  and  teams. He represented Brazil in five Olympic Games between 2000 and 2016, and competed at thirteen Grand Tours.

Career
Fischer was born in Brusque, Santa Catarina. At , Fischer proved his consistency over a season by winning the 2005 UCI Europe Tour. He became the second Brazilian to win a UCI World Tour race stage, winning stage five at the 2007 Tour de Pologne.

Fischer left  at the end of the 2012 season, and joined  on a two-year contract from the 2013 season onwards.

Fisher completed the 2015 Vuelta a España and he became the first Brazilian rider to have completed all Grand Tours.

Major results

2000
 1st Prova Ciclística 9 de Julho
 2nd Tour do Rio
2001
 2nd Copa América de Ciclismo
2002
 1st Stage 4 Giro Ciclistico d'Italia
 2nd Tour do Rio
2003
 1st  Road race, UCI B World Championships
2004
 4th Overall Uniqa Classic
 6th Overall Tour Down Under
 6th Criterium d'Abruzzo
2005
 1st Overall UCI Europe Tour
 1st Giro del Piemonte
 1st Gran Premio Bruno Beghelli
 1st Gran Premio Industria e Commercio di Prato
 1st Trofeo Città di Castelfidardo
 1st Due Giorni Marchigiana
 1st Memorial Cimurri
 1st Stage 3 Tour of Qinghai Lake
 2nd Overall Uniqa Classic
1st Stages 1 & 3
 2nd Giro del Lazio
 3rd Coppa Bernocchi
 3rd Gran Premio Industria e Commercio Artigianato Carnaghese
 4th Stausee-Rundfahrt Klingnau
 4th Gran Premio Città di Misano – Adriatico
 4th Coppa Sabatini
 5th Road race, UCI Road World Championships
 7th Overall Circuit de Lorraine
2006
 8th Overall Giro della Provincia di Lucca
2007
 1st Stage 5 Tour de Pologne
 2nd Gran Premio Industria e Commercio di Prato
 3rd Trofeo Calvia
 10th Dwars door Vlaanderen
2008
 4th Gran Premio Industria e Commercio Artigianato Carnaghese
 4th Vattenfall Cyclassics
 6th Coppa Bernocchi
2009
 1st Giro della Romagna
 3rd Road race, National Road Championships
 7th Giro del Friuli
 10th Grand Prix de Fourmies
2010
 1st  Road race, National Road Championships
 2nd Gran Premio Nobili Rubinetterie
2011
 1st  Road race, National Road Championships
 1st Trofeo Magaluf-Palmanova
 4th Trofeo Inca
2012
 1st Stage 2 (TTT) Tour of Qatar

Grand Tour general classification results timeline

References

External links

Palmares on Cycling Base (French)

Living people
1979 births
Brazilian male cyclists
Brazilian road racing cyclists
Brazilian people of German descent
Olympic cyclists of Brazil
Cyclists at the 2000 Summer Olympics
Cyclists at the 2003 Pan American Games
Cyclists at the 2004 Summer Olympics
Cyclists at the 2008 Summer Olympics
Cyclists at the 2011 Pan American Games
Cyclists at the 2012 Summer Olympics
Cyclists at the 2016 Summer Olympics
People from Brusque, Santa Catarina
Pan American Games competitors for Brazil
Sportspeople from Santa Catarina (state)
20th-century Brazilian people
21st-century Brazilian people